"One Summer" is a single by Daryl Braithwaite from his 1988 album Edge. Braithwaite was inspired to write the song by the British television series One Summer. The single reached No. 8 in Australia, No. 5 in Norway and No. 4 in Sweden. It was certified gold in Australia.

A music video was created for the song. It features footage of various people at the beach mixed with shots of Braithwaite, Chuck Hargreaves (in a red shirt) and John "Jak" Housden (in a yellow shirt) playing the song on the front porch of a rural property.

Braithwaite performed the song live on Hey, Hey, It's Saturday on 16 February 1989.

Track listing 
Side A "One Summer" – 3:42
Side B "Pretending to Care" – 3:39

Charts

Weekly charts

Year-end charts

Certification

References 

1989 singles
1989 songs
Columbia Records singles
Daryl Braithwaite songs
Song recordings produced by Simon Hussey
Songs written by Daryl Braithwaite